Becoming is the memoir by former First Lady of the United States Michelle Obama, published on November 13, 2018. Described by the author as a deeply personal experience, the book talks about her roots and how she found her voice, as well as her time in the White House, her public health campaign, and her role as a mother. The book is published by Crown and was released in 24 languages. One million copies were donated to First Book, an American nonprofit organization which provides books to children.

It was the highest-selling book published in the United States in 2018, setting the record 15 days after its publication, with over two million copies sold.

Background 
The 448-page memoir was published on November 13, 2018. Barack Obama said Michelle had a ghostwriter. The Observer notes that Becoming acknowledgements section thanks a team of people involved in finishing the book.

Synopsis 
The book's 24 chapters (plus a preface and epilogue) are divided into three sections: Becoming Me, Becoming Us, and Becoming More.

The preface sets the stage for Michelle Obama's story to open by sketching a scene in her post-First Lady life. Becoming Me traces Obama's early life growing up on the South Side of Chicago with her parents - Fraser and Marian Robinson - in an upstairs apartment where she got her first piano lessons and learnt to be an independent girl under the nurturing care of her parents. There, Obama shared a bedroom with her brother Craig. The book continues through her education at Princeton University and Harvard Law School, to her early career as a lawyer at the law firm Sidley Austin, where she met Barack Obama. While this section talks considerably at length about Obama's Princeton experience and Sidley Austin, Harvard Law school's experiences are mentioned marginally by comparison.

Becoming Us departs from the beginning of the Obamas' romantic relationship and follows their marriage, and the beginning of his political career in the Illinois State Senate. This section also notes Obama's career "swerve" from corporate law to the non-profit realm as she continued to work while raising her daughters and speaking at political events, becoming gradually more involved in her husband's campaign. The book shares Obama's balance between her position as the first African American First Lady of the United States of America, her motherly duties, and marital commitments. The section ends with election night in 2008 when Barack Obama was elected President of the United States.

Becoming More takes the readers through Barack Obama's presidency, Michelle Obama's focus on her Let's Move campaign, and her role of "head mom in chief" to her two daughters - Malia and Sasha Obama, along with the other aspects of the Obama's life as first family. The Epilogue talks about the last day of Obamas in the White House which was also Donald Trump's inauguration ceremony and Michelle Obama's reflection on Optimism. She also expresses her lack of desire to ever run for office.

Book sales 
Total book sales, including hardcover, audio and e-books editions, sold around 725,000 copies in the United States and Canada during its first day, making it the second best-selling debut for any book in 2018. Bob Woodward's Fear: Trump in the White House holds the record after selling around 900,000 copies during its first day. However, Barnes and Noble reported that Becoming surpassed Fear in first-week sales and had more first-week sales of any adult book since Go Set a Watchman in 2015. The book sold 1.4 million copies in its first week. After 15 days, the book became the best-selling book in the US for the year 2018.

By March 26, 2019, Becoming had sold 10 million copies. According to The New York Times, as of November 2020 the book has "sold 14 million copies worldwide, including more than 8 million in the U.S. and Canada".

Reception 
The review aggregator website Book Marks reported that 18% of critics gave the book a "rave" review, while 73% of the critics expressed "positive" impressions, based on a sample of 22 reviews. It was an Oprah's Book Club 2.0 selection. The book was given over 42,000 ratings and over 41,000 reviews on Goodreads and received 4.55 out of 5 stars. Hannah Giogris, a writer from The Atlantic, used the words "refreshing" and "striking" to describe the book.

In 2020, the audiobook edition won the Grammy Award for Best Spoken Word Album and was named one of the top ten Amazing Audiobooks for Young Adults by the American Library Association.

Soundtrack 
American musician Questlove curated a soundtrack for the book, called The Michelle Obama Musiaqualogy.

Tour 
In November 2018, Michelle Obama went on a national book tour conducted in arenas, often to sold-out crowds starting in Chicago at the United Center. Obama previewed the book and tour on Chicago's Windy City Live daytime television show at her alma mater Whitney M. Young Magnet High School on Chicago's Near West Side.

The initial tour included 12 venues in 10 cities, but expanded with its popularity; as of February 2019, another 21 cities had been added, including six in Europe and four in Canada.

Film 

In May 2020, a documentary film based on the book was released on Netflix, following Obama through her book tour. The documentary features footage of Obama's travels behind-the-scenes of the tour and clips of her interviews onstage with moderators including Oprah Winfrey and Stephen Colbert.

References

External links 

Official website for Japan 
Interview with Michelle Obama on Becoming, conducted by Oprah Winfrey, November 13, 2018, C-SPAN

2018 non-fiction books
American memoirs
Memoirs adapted into films
Books by Michelle Obama
Crown Publishing Group books
Political memoirs
Viking Press books